Albany-Saratoga Speedway is a 0.36-mile dirt oval on U.S. Route 9 in Malta, New York. The track features racing on Friday nights, with five different weekly racing divisions, including DIRTcar modifieds, DIRTcar sportsman, limited sportsman, pro stocks and street stocks and also four cylinder racers.

The speedway opened in 1965. The track held NASCAR Cup Series races in 1970 and 1971 which were both won by Richard Petty. From 1977 It was owned by the family of C. J. Richards, a founder of the Champlain Valley Racing Association.  In 2011 it was put up for sale.  After a period of uncertainty as to whether or not it would continue to be used for racing, it was purchased by  the owners of Lebanon Valley Speedway in West Lebanon, New York.

References

External links
Official Website

Sports venues in Saratoga County, New York
Motorsport venues in New York (state)
1965 establishments in New York (state)
Sports  venues completed in 1965

NASCAR tracks